Wendish may refer to: 

 Sorbian languages, spoken in Germany
 Prekmurje Slovene, spoken in Slovenia and Hungary
 Wends, a Slav people of Northern Europe

Language and nationality disambiguation pages